Jaleen Roberts (born November 19, 1998) is an American track and field athlete. Born with cerebral palsy, she has won medals for Team USA at the 2017 World Para Athletics Championships, 2019 Parapan American Games, and 2019 World Para Athletics Championships.

Early life and education
Roberts was born on November 19, 1998, in Tacoma, Washington. Although she was born with cerebral palsy, Roberts competed in soccer, wrestling, gymnastics and track growing up. While attending Mill Creek Middle School and Kent-Meridian High School, Roberts competed in wrestling, gymnastics, basketball and track. She decided to stick with wrestling and track in high school, where she qualified for the state wrestling tournament in both her junior and senior years. By the conclusion of her high school career, Roberts was the co-recipient of Female Field Athlete of the Year with Jessica Heims.

Career
Roberts enrolled at Eastern Washington University where she studied Health and Physical Education to become a physical education teacher. As a student, she competed with the United States National Team at the 2017 World Para Athletics Championships. Roberts earned two bronze medals in the Women's 100 metres and Women's 200 metres, and silver in the Women's long jump. Her time of 28.28 for the 200 meters set a United States record.

At the 2019 World Para Athletics Championships, she again earned a silver medal in the long jump. Roberts also qualified for the 2019 Parapan American Games where she earned four gold medals and set two record times. As a result of her athleticism, she was named to the United States 2020 Paralympics Track and Field National Team.

References

External links
 

1998 births
Living people
Sportspeople from Spokane, Washington
Track and field athletes from Washington (state)
Track and field athletes with cerebral palsy
American female sprinters
American female long jumpers
World Para Athletics Championships winners
Medalists at the 2019 Parapan American Games
Athletes (track and field) at the 2020 Summer Paralympics
Medalists at the 2020 Summer Paralympics
Paralympic silver medalists for the United States
Paralympic medalists in athletics (track and field)
Sportspeople from Kent, Washington
Eastern Washington University alumni
21st-century American women